Trapelus agnetae is a species of agama found in Israel and Jordan.

References

Trapelus
Lizards of Asia
Reptiles of Jordan
Taxa named by Franz Werner
Reptiles described in 1929